William Lind may refer to:

 William S. Lind (born 1947), American conservative author
 William Lind (orienteer) (born 1985), Swedish orienteering competitor